Ollie Nott (born 26 May 1995) is a Canadian rugby union player, currently playing for the Toronto Arrows of Major League Rugby (MLR) and the Canadian national team. His preferred position is flanker.

Professional career
Nott signed for Major League Rugby side Toronto Arrows in June 2021 during the 2021 Major League Rugby season. Nott made his debut for Canada in the 2017 Americas Rugby Championship.

References

External links
itsrugby.co.uk Profile

1995 births
Living people
Canadian rugby union players
Canada international rugby union players
Rugby union flankers
Toronto Arrows players